Kotlin  is a village in Jarocin County, Greater Poland Voivodeship, in west-central Poland. It is the seat of the gmina (administrative district) called Gmina Kotlin.

The village has a population of 3,416.

References

Kotlin